Greatest Hits DVD 1978–1997 – Music Videos and Live Performances is the second DVD by the American rock band Journey, released in 2003. It contains music videos and live performances of songs from the band's history with longtime lead vocalist Steve Perry, who left the band in 1998. It is Journey's best selling concert video going 4× Multi-Platinum since its 2003 release.

Track listing 
 "Don't Stop Believin'" (1981 – Live, Escape Tour, Houston, TX)
 "Wheel in the Sky" (1978 – Music video)
 "Faithfully" (1983 – Music video)
 "Any Way You Want It" (1981 – Live, Escape Tour, Houston, TX (P.A. Board Mix))
 "Separate Ways (Worlds Apart)" (1983 – Music video)
 "Lights" (1978 – Music video)
 "Lovin', Touchin', Squeezin'" (1979 – Music video)
 "Be Good to Yourself" (1986 – Live, Raised on Radio Tour, Mountain Aire Festival, Angels Camp, CA)
 "When You Love a Woman" (1996 – Music video)
 "Who's Crying Now" (1981 – Live, Escape Tour, Houston, TX (P.A. Board Mix))
 "Send Her My Love" (1983 – Music video)
 "Girl Can't Help It" (1986 – Live, Raised on Radio Tour, Mountain Aire Festival, Angels Camp, CA)
 "Open Arms" (1981 – Live, Escape Tour, Houston, TX (P.A. Board Mix))
 "Just the Same Way" (1980 – Music video)
 "Stone in Love" (1981 – Live, Escape Tour, Houston, TX)
 "Feeling That Way" (1978 – Music Video)
 "After the Fall" (1983 – Music video)
 "I'll Be Alright Without You" (1986 – Live, Raised on Radio Tour, Atlanta, GA)

Personnel 
Steve Perry – lead vocals
Neal Schon – guitar, vocals
Jonathan Cain – keyboards, vocals
Ross Valory – bass, vocals
Steve Smith – drums
Gregg Rolie – keyboards, vocals
Aynsley Dunbar – drums
Randy Jackson – bass, vocals
Michael Baird – drums

References 

2003 video albums
Journey (band) video albums
Music video compilation albums
Columbia Records video albums